In Norse mythology, Sköll (Old Norse: Skǫll, "Treachery" or "Mockery") is a wolf that, according to Snorri Sturluson's Prose Edda,  chases the Sun (personified as a goddess, Sól). Hati Hróðvitnisson chases the Moon (personified, see Máni).

According to Rudolf Simek, it is possible that Sköll is another name for Fenrir, and, if so, "there could be a nature-mythological interpretation in the case of Sköll and Hati (who pursues the moon). Such an interpretation suggests the wolves may be intended to describe the phenomenon of parhelia and paraselenae or Sun dogs and Moon dogs, as these are called 'sun-wolf' in Scandinavian languages (Norwegian solulv, Swedish solvarg)."

See also
 List of wolves

Notes

References
Orchard, Andy (1997). Dictionary of Norse Myth and Legend. Cassell. 
Simek, Rudolf (2007) translated by Angela Hall. Dictionary of Northern Mythology. D.S. Brewer. 

Wolves in Norse mythology
Mythological canines